The Glimpses of the Moon is a 1977 detective novel by the British writer Edmund Crispin. It was the ninth and last novel in his series featuring Gervase Fen, an Oxford professor and amateur detective. Written from the 1960s onwards on publication it was the first novel in the series to be released since The Long Divorce in 1951. The author died the following year and in 1979 a final work Fen Country, a collection of short stories featuring the detective, was publish posthumously. 

The title is taken from a line from Shakespeare's Hamlet. It is set in the village of Aller in rural Devon.

References

Bibliography
 Bargainnier, Earl F. Comic Crime. Popular Press, 1987.
 Reilly, John M. Twentieth Century Crime & Mystery Writers. Springer, 2015.
 Whittle, David. Bruce Montgomery/Edmund Crispin: A Life in Music and Books. Routledge, 2017.

1977 British novels
British mystery novels
British crime novels
British comedy novels
Novels by Edmund Crispin
Novels set in Devon
British detective novels
Victor Gollancz Ltd books